The King Steps Out is a 1936 American light comedy film directed by Josef von Sternberg based on the early years of Empress Elisabeth of Austria, known as "Sisi" or "Sissi", and her courtship and marriage to Franz Joseph I of Austria, after he was initially engaged to her older sister Duchess Helene in Bavaria. The film is set from 1852 to 1854.

The script was written by Sidney Buchman, based on a theatre play called Sissys Brautfahrt by Ernst Décsey and Robert Weil aka Gustav Holm. Columbia Pictures bought the rights from Ernst Marischka in order to make the film. The lyrics for the music were by Dorothy Fields and the music by Viennese composer and violinist Fritz Kreisler. Cinematography was by Lucien Ballard and the editing by Viola Lawrence. Costume design was by the Austrian Ernst Deutsch-Dryden.

Future Broadway dancer Gwen Verdon made her movie debut doing a ballet solo at age 11, but was uncredited.

The film had only minimal influence on the later Sissi trilogy from the 1950s by Ernst Marischka starring Romy Schneider and Karlheinz Böhm.

Cast 
 Grace Moore as Princess Elizabeth
 Franchot Tone as Emperor Franz Josef
 Walter Connolly as Duke of Bavaria
 Raymond Walburn as Colonel von Kempen
 Elisabeth Risdon as Archduchess Sophie
 Nana Bryant as Princess Louise
 Victor Jory as Captain Palffy
 Frieda Inescort as Princess Helena
 Thurston Hall as Major
 Herman Bing as Pretzelberger
 George Hassell as Herlicka
 Johnny Arthur as Chief of the Secret Police
 Charles Coleman as Lieutenant (uncredited) 
 William Hopper as Soldier (uncredited)
 Henry Roquemore as Waiter (uncredited) 
 C. Montague Shaw as Russian Delegate (uncredited) 
 Al Shean as Ballet Master (uncredited) 
 Gwen Verdon as Specialty Ballerina (uncredited)

Reception
Writing for The Spectator in 1936, Graham Greene gave the film a mildly positive review, noting that in its "light and amusing sequences" it bore the hallmarks of "the Lubitsch touch". Greene praised the acting of Bing, claiming that "the whole film [is carried] on his wildly expressive shoulders".

References

External links 

 

1936 films
1936 musical comedy films
American musical comedy films
Films directed by Josef von Sternberg
Films with screenplays by Sidney Buchman
Columbia Pictures films
American films based on plays
Films set in Austria
Films set in Bavaria
Films set in 1852
Films set in 1853
Films set in 1854
Films set in Vienna
Cultural depictions of Empress Elisabeth of Austria
Cultural depictions of Franz Joseph I of Austria
American black-and-white films
1930s historical comedy films
American historical comedy films
1930s English-language films
1930s American films